1BC is a three-letter acronym that may refer to:
 Empresas 1BC, a Venezuelan corporation
 1 BC, the last BC year